This is the filmography of Hong Kong actor and singer Ekin Cheng

Films

Television Movies

Voice Acting

Television

TVB series

This is the list of television dramas and variety shows of Hong Kong actor and singer Ekin Cheng.

Note: English title in italic indicates the name is simply a translation of the Chinese title as no official English title exists.

TVB Variety Shows

Others

References

Male actor filmographies
Hong Kong filmographies